The Ministry of Socially And Educationally, Backward Classes - SEBC is a Ministry of the Government of Maharashtra. 
state.

The Ministry is headed by a cabinet level Minister. Atul Save is Current Minister of Socially And Educationally Backward Classes Government of Maharashtra.

Head office

List of Cabinet Ministers

List of Ministers of State

References 

Government of Maharashtra
Government ministries of Maharashtra